PNS Moawin (A39), is a fleet replenishment tanker currently in service with the Pakistan Navy. Designed by the Turkish firm, STM, she was built and constructed by the Karachi Shipyard and Engineering Works in Karachi, Pakistan. Moawin  is noted for its displacement, being the largest warship ever built in Pakistan. 

According to the Pakistan military, Moawin  provides fuel, water, and ammunition to Pakistan military's combat and auxiliary units as it is also equipped with state-of-the-art medical facilities to support the Pakistan Navy during war and disaster relief missions.

Brief overview
On 22 January 2013, the Ministry of Defence Production (MoDP) signed a contract with the Turkish company STM to design the ship in Turkey together with providing a Kit of Materials to Pakistan, while the engineering construction, outfitting, and sea trials were to be undertaken by Karachi Shipyard in Pakistan.
Steel cutting started on 27 November 2013 before the keel was laid down in Karachi on 7 March 2014. She was launched on 19 August 2016 in a ceremony attended by the Prime Minister Nawaz Sharif. Moawin was commissioned by President Arif Alvi on 16 October 2018.

Moawin is designed to provide the Navy's auxiliary support including refuelling and replenishing naval warships.

Construction design and propulsion
The complement is about 228, including 20 officers & 208 enlisted. 

The fleet tanker can autonomously endure at sea for a period of 90 days.

The vessel complies with the latest International Maritime Organisation (IMO) and marine pollution (MARPOL) regulations..

References

External links
 Pakistan Navy Official Site

2016 ships
Pakistan–Turkey relations
Ships of the Pakistan Navy
Tankers of the Pakistan Navy
Ships built in Pakistan